Certain gendarmerie and paramilitary police forces include the words "armed police" as part of their name. They may be part of the armed forces of a country, and are responsible for policing the civilian population (and usually the armed forces as well). It may also refer to the armed component of largely unarmed police forces, such as Armed Response Units in British police. 

Organisations whose names contain the word "armed police" include:
 Armed Police Corps, former Spanish urban police force
 Armed Police Force, Nepalese paramilitary police force
 Central Armed Police Forces, Indian paramilitary police forces
 People's Armed Police, Chinese paramilitary police force